The Sri Lankan Tamil dialects or Ceylon Tamil or commonly in Tamil language Eelam Tamil are a group of Tamil dialects used in Sri Lanka by its native Tamil people and Eastern Moors, and Coast Veddas that is distinct from the dialects of Tamil spoken in Tamil Nadu and Sri Lanka. It is broadly categorized into three sub groups: Jaffna Tamil, Batticaloa Tamil, and Negombo Tamil dialects. But there are number of sub dialects within these broad regional dialects as well. These dialects are also used by ethnic groups other than Tamils and Moors such as Sinhalese people, Portuguese Burghers and the indigenous Coastal Vedda people.

Characteristics

As Tamil is a diglossic language the differences between the standard written languages across the globe is minimal but the spoken varieties differ considerably. The spoken Tamil varieties in Sri Lanka although different from those of Tamil Nadu in India share some common features with the southern dialects of Tamil Nadu. Sri Lankan Tamil dialects retain many words and grammatical forms that are not in everyday use in Tamil Nadu, and use many other words slightly differently. The Sri Lankan Tamil dialects are less influenced by Sanskrit and the western languages, although there are western and Sanskrit loan words in day to day usage. In general Sri Lankan Tamil dialects are considered to be more conservative than the continental Tamil dialects.

Dialects

Negombo Tamil

The Negombo Tamil dialect, used in the Negombo area by bilingual fishers who otherwise identify themselves as Sinhalese, has undergone considerable morphosyntactic convergence with spoken or colloquial Sinhala as a consequence of contact with it. It has also developed a number of other grammatical traits under the probable influence of Sinhala, including a postposed indefinite article, an indefinitizing postclitic –sari (apparently modeled on Sinhala –hari), and case assignments for defective verbs that follow the Sinhala, rather than Tamil, patterns of agreement.

Batticaloa Tamil

Batticaloa Tamil dialect is shared between Tamils, Moors, Veddhas and Portuguese Burghers in the eastern province. The Tamil dialect used by residents of the Trincomalee district has many similarities with the Jaffna Tamil dialect. According to Kamil Zvelebil a linguist, the Batticaloa Tamil dialect is the most literary like of all spoken dialects of Tamil, and it has preserved several very antique features, and  has remained more true to the literary norm than any other form of Tamil while developing a few striking innovations. Although Batticaloa Tamil has some very specific features of vocabulary, it is classified with other Sri Lankan Tamil dialects as it is related to them by characteristic traits of its phonology. It also maintains some words that are unique to present day .

Jaffna Tamil

The dialect used in Jaffna is the oldest and most archaic of Tamil dialects in Sri Lanka and India. It is also very refined and considered to preserve many antique features of Old Tamil that predate Tolkāppiyam, the grammatical treatise of Tamil. The Jaffna Tamil dialect retained many forms of words which were used in Sangam literature such as Tirukkuṛaḷ and Kuṟuntokai. Also a large portion of settlers in Jaffna who came from South India in the past centuries were Vellalar and this would have helped retain classical linguistic features since Vellalars speak a classic dialect of Tamil. Jaffna Tamil dialect is not mutually intelligible with Indian Tamil dialects, though both share a diglossic `H' variety in literary Tamil. It is frequently mistaken for Malayalam by native Indian Tamil speakers. There are a number of Prakrit loans words that are unique to the Jaffna Tamil. A subdialect retained by the Paraiyar people of Kayts still retains a number of archaic words and Prakrit loans not found in any other dialects of Tamil. These drummers had historically played an important role as ritual players of drums at funerals and folk temples and as heralds and traditional weavers. They also maintained the family records of their feudal lords and even practiced medicine and astrology in folk traditions

See also
 Indian Tamil dialect of Sri Lanka
 Sri Lankan Muslim Tamil
 Tamil loanwords in Sinhala
 Loan words in Sri Lankan Tamil

Notes

Cited literature

External links
 Collection of riddles from Jaffna Tamil

Tamil dialects
Dialect
Languages of Sri Lanka